John Houston Marshall (June 18, 1904 – November 7, 1977) was a college football player and entrepreneur, with various business interests, including trucking and insurance.

Georgia Tech
Johnny Marshall was a prominent end for William Alexander's Georgia Tech Yellow Jackets football teams. He was selected All-Southern in 1926. The yearbook in 1925 remarked '"Johnnie" could have made "All-American" had he caught that pass in the Alabama game."

Personal life
Marshall was from Jacksonville, where he returned after graduation from Georgia Tech, founding the John Marshall Agency Inc.

He married Catherine M. Beckham. She was the daughter of Charlotte W. Mahone, the first woman to serve as Dean of Students at Florida State College for Women; and Brigadier General Robert H. Beckham, a former Adjutant General of Texas who served in the Spanish American War.

His only child, Carlotta Marshall, worked as a photographer in New York where she formed a close friendship with Diane Arbus.

See also
1926 College Football All-Southern Team

Notes

References

1904 births
1977 deaths
Georgia Tech Yellow Jackets football players
American football ends

Players of American football from Jacksonville, Florida